King's Quoit is a Neolithic burial chamber in Manorbier,  east of Pembroke, Pembrokeshire, Wales. It is a scheduled monument.

Description
The cromlech known as the King's Quoit is south of Manorbier bay and beach. The monument is on high land above the steep cliff overlooking the bay. The chamber is partly below ground.

See also
 British megalith architecture
 List of Scheduled prehistoric Monuments in south Pembrokeshire

References

Megalithic monuments in Wales
Scheduled monuments in Pembrokeshire